Dachnaya is a rural locality (a village) in Pokrovsky Selsoviet, Blagoveshchensky District, Bashkortostan, Russia. The population was 5 as of 2010. There is one street.

Geography 
Dachnaya is located 35 km northeast of Blagoveshchensk (the district's administrative centre) by road.

References 

Rural localities in Blagoveshchensky District